The War of Women is the first full-length album released by Joe Firstman on Atlantic Records.

Track listing
 "Introduction to the War of Women" – 1:25
 "Breaking All the Ground" – 4:25
 "Can't Stop Loving You" – 3:56
 "Now You're Gorgeous, Now You're Gone" – 4:02
 "Car Door (Dancing in the Aisles)" – 3:32
 "Saving All the Love" – 3:39
 "Slave or Siren" – 3:30
 "Chasing You Down" – 5:00
 "The Adventures of the Empress of Harlem and the Amazing Subway Boy" – 3:48
 "Lies" – 5:05
 "Beautiful" – 4:15
 "Secondhand Grave" – 5:26
 "Speak Your Mind" – 4:29
 "Savannah" – 3:07
 "After Los Angeles" – 10:27

References

2003 debut albums
Joe Firstman albums
Atlantic Records albums